The 2013 Florida Gators baseball team represented the University of Florida in the sport of baseball during the 2013 college baseball season.  The Gators competed in Division I of the National Collegiate Athletic Association (NCAA) and the Eastern Division of the Southeastern Conference (SEC).  They played their home games at Alfred A. McKethan Stadium, on the university's Gainesville, Florida campus.  The team was coached by Kevin O'Sullivan, who was in his sixth season at Florida. The Gators entered the season looking to build upon their appearance in the 2012 College World Series, where they were eliminated after two consecutive losses to South Carolina and Kent State.

The Gators suffered from inexperience for much of the season and experienced key injuries to their pitching staff. As a result, the team struggled to a record of 11–16 by mid-season. From that point forward however, the Gators climbed their way back into postseason contention by winning 14 out of 18 games including a series win over No. 11 Ole Miss, a series sweep over No. 8 South Carolina, and a road win over No. 7 Florida State. Despite struggling once again toward the end of the season, the Gators earned a berth in the 2013 NCAA Tournament as a No. 3 seed in the Bloomington, Indiana regional where they were eliminated after consecutive losses to Austin Peay and Valparaiso. The team finished with their first losing record since 2007.

Roster

Schedule

! style="background:#FF4A00;color:white;"| Regular Season
|- valign="top" 

|- bgcolor="#ffdddd"
|  ||  || No. 13  || McKethan Stadium || 3–4 || Huber (1–0) || Stump (0–1) || Istler (1) || 5,771 || 0–1 || –
|- bgcolor="#ddffdd"
| February 16 || Duke || No. 13 || McKethan Stadium || 4–2 || Danciu (1–0) || Van Orden (0–1) || Magliozzi (1) || 3,890 || 1–1 || –
|- bgcolor="#ddffdd"
| February 17 || Duke || No. 13 || McKethan Stadium || 16–5 || Harris (1–0) || Matuella (0–1) || None || 3,581 || 2–1 || – 
|- bgcolor="#ddffdd"
| February 19 || at UCF || No. 13 || Jay Bergman FieldOrlando, FL || 5–3 || Danciu (2–0) || Adkins (0–1) || Magliozzi (2) || 3,678 || 3–1 || –
|- bgcolor="#ffdddd"
| February 20 ||  || No. 13 || McKethan Stadium || 7–812 || Rowe (1–0) || Stump (0–2) || None || 2,759 || 3–2 || –
|- bgcolor="#ffdddd"
| February 22 ||  || No. 13 || McKethan Stadium || 2–8 || Knapp (2–0) || Crawford (0–1) || None || 3,643 || 3–3 || –
|- bgcolor="#ffdddd"
| February 23 || Florida Gulf Coast || No. 13 || McKethan Stadium || 3–8 || Bixler (1–0) || Simpson (0–1) || Brown (1) || 3,901 || 3–4 || –
|- bgcolor="#ffdddd"
| February 24 || Florida Gulf Coast || No. 13 || McKethan Stadium || 4–711 || Cooney (1–1) || Shafer (0–1) || None || 3,133 || 3–5 || –
|- bgcolor="#ffdddd"
| February 26 ||  ||  || McKethan Stadium || 6–710 || Incinelli (2–0) || Harris (1–1) || Olmstead (1) || 2,771 || 3–6 || –
|-

|- bgcolor="#ffdddd"
| March 1 || No. 21 Rivalry||  || McKethan Stadium || 2–3 || Nedeljkovic (2–0) ||  || Salcines (2) || 3,412 || 3–7 || –
|- bgcolor="#ddffdd"
| March 2 || No. 21 Miami (FL)Rivalry ||  || McKethan Stadium  || 6–4 || Magliozzi (1–0) || Salcines (2–1) || None || 3,899 || 4–7 || –
|- bgcolor="#ddffdd"
| March 3 || No. 21 Miami (FL)Rivalry ||  || McKethan Stadium  || 6–3 ||  || Suarez (1–1) || None || 3,786 || 5–7 || –
|- bgcolor="#ddffdd"
| March 5 || at  ||  || Jacksonville, FL || 8–5 || Magliozzi (2–0) || Baker (0–2) || None || 2,104 || 6–7 || –
|- bgcolor="#ddffdd"
| March 6 || Jacksonville ||  || McKethan Stadium || 7–6 || Harris (2–1) || Woods (0–1) || None || 2,395 || 7–7 || –
|- bgcolor="#ffdddd"
| March 8 || Indiana ||  || McKethan Stadium  || 1–4 || DeNato (2–1) || Crawford (0–2) || Effross (1) || 2,828 || 7–8 || –
|- bgcolor="#ddffdd"
| March 9 || Indiana ||  || McKethan Stadium || 6–4 || Carmichael (2–1) || Harrison (0–1) || Magliozzi (3) || 3,380 || 8–8 || – 
|- bgcolor="#ffdddd"
|  || Indiana ||  || McKethan Stadium || 4–7 || Hart (2–0) || Hanhold (0–1) || None || 3,403 || 8–9 || –
|- bgcolor="#ffdddd"
| March 12 || No. 5 Rivalry ||  || McKethan Stadium || 1–4 || Weaver (3–0) || Young (0–1) || None || 4,709 || 8–10 || –
|- bgcolor="#ddffdd"
| March 15 || No. 10 Kentucky ||  || McKethan Stadium || 4–1 || Harris (3–1) || Reed (2–2) || Magliozzi (4) || 3,540 || 9–10 || 1–0
|- bgcolor="#ffdddd"
| March 16 || No. 10 Kentucky ||  || McKethan Stadium || 5–11 || Grundy (4–1) || Crawford (0–3) || Gott (6) || 3,120 || 9–11 || 1–1
|- bgcolor="#ffdddd"
| March 17 || No. 10 Kentucky ||  || McKethan Stadium || 2–6 || Littrell (3–0) || Hanhold (0–2) || None || 3,284 || 9–12 || 1–2 
|- bgcolor="#ddffdd"
| March 19 || North Florida ||  || McKethan Stadium || 9–4 || Simpson (1–1) || Trexler (2–2) || None || 2,338 || 10–12 || – 
|- bgcolor="#ddffdd"
| March 22 || at No. 2 Vanderbilt ||  || Hawkins FieldNashville, TN || 7–1 || Carmichael (3–1) || Ziomek (5–1) || None || 2,477 || 11–12 || 2–2
|- bgcolor="#ffdddd"
| March 23 || at No. 2 Vanderbilt ||  || Hawkins Field || 1–6 || Beede (6–0) || Crawford (0–4) || None || 2,733 || 11–13 || 2–3 
|- bgcolor="#ffdddd"
| March 24 || at No. 2 Vanderbilt ||  || Hawkins Field || 4–57 || Miller (3–0) || Harris (3–2) || None || 2,484 || 11–14 || 2–4 
|- bgcolor="#ffdddd"
| March 26 || vs. No. 4 Florida StateRivalry ||  || Baseball GroundsJacksonville, FL || 1–2 || Smith (3–0) || Young (0–2) || Coles (5) || 9,269 || 11–15 || –
|- bgcolor="#ffdddd"
| March 29 || No. 11  ||  || McKethan Stadium || 3–411 || Greenwood (3–0) || Magliozzi (2–1) || Huber (7) || 3,959 || 11–16 || 2–5
|- bgcolor="#ddffdd"
| March 30 || No. 11 Ole Miss ||  || McKethan Stadium || 7–0 || Crawford (1–4) || Mayers (2–3) || None || 3,668 || 12–16 || 3–5 
|- bgcolor="#ddffdd"
| March 31 || No. 11 Ole Miss ||  || McKethan Stadium || 4–0 || Young (1–2) || Ellis (1–2) || Magliozzi (5) || 2,934 || 13–16 || 4–5 
|-

|- bgcolor="#ddffdd"
| April 2 || UCF ||  || McKethan Stadium || 5–3 || Harris (4–2) || Matulis (3–1) || Magliozzi (6) || 3,225 || 14–16 || –
|- bgcolor="#ffdddd"
| April 5 ||  ||  || Dudy Noble FieldStarkville, MS || 3–7 || Pollorena (5–1) || Crawford (1–5) || Holder (9) || 8,414 || 14–17 || 4–6
|- bgcolor="#ffdddd"
| April 6 || at No. 17  ||  || Dudy Noble Field || 0–2 || Graveman (4–2) || Young (1–3) || None || 8,564 || 14–18 || 4–7
|- bgcolor="#ddffdd"
| April 7 || at No. 17  ||  || Dudy Noble Field || 8–3 || Magliozzi (3–1) || Lindgren (2–1) || None || 7,660 || 15–18 || 5–7 
|- bgcolor="#ddffdd"
| April 9 || at No. 7 Florida StateRivalry ||  || Tallahassee, FL || 4–3 || Gibson (1–0) || Coles (2–1) || None || 6,719 || 16–18 || –
|- bgcolor="#ddffdd"
| April 11 || No. 8 South Carolina ||  || McKethan Stadium || 3–2 || Crawford (2–5) || Belcher (5–3) || Magliozzi (7) || 3,268 || 17–18 || 6–7
|- bgcolor="#ddffdd"
| April 12 || No. 8 South Carolina ||  || McKethan Stadium || 4–3 || Rhodes (1–0) ||  || Magliozzi (8) || 4,515 || 18–18 || 7–7
|- bgcolor="#ddffdd"
| April 13 || No. 8 South Carolina ||  || McKethan Stadium || 14–5 || Gibson (2–0) || Wynkoop (4–2) || None || 4,374 || 19–18 || 8–7
|- bgcolor="#ddffdd"
| April 16 || vs. Florida Gulf Coast ||  || Hammond StadiumFort Myers, FL || 5–3 || Poyner (1–0) || Brown (1–1) || Magliozzi (9) || 4,525 || 20–18 || –
|- bgcolor="#ddffdd"
| April 19 || at Missouri ||  || Taylor StadiumColumbia, MO || 8–6 || Crawford (3–5) || Zastryzny (2–7) || Magliozzi (10) || 840 || 21–18 || 9–7 
|- bgcolor="#ddffdd"
| April 20 || at Missouri ||  || Taylor Stadium || 4–315 || Poyner (2–0) || Anderson (0–1) || Magliozzi (11) || 2,563 || 22–18 || 10–7
|- bgcolor="#ffdddd"
| April 21 || at Missouri ||  || Taylor Stadium || 2–8 || Walsh (1–0) || Simpson (1–2) || Miles (2) || 1,018 || 22–19 || 10–8
|- bgcolor="#ddffdd"
| April 23 ||  ||  || McKethan Stadium || 12–1 || Young (2–3) || Clarkson (1–5) || None || 2,892 || 23–19 || –
|- bgcolor="#ddffdd"
| April 26 ||  ||  || McKethan Stadium || 7–2 || Young (3–3) || Quillen (1–3) || None || 3,864 || 24–19 || 11–8 
|- bgcolor="#ddffdd"
| April 27 || Tennessee ||  || McKethan Stadium || 3–210|| Magliozzi (4–1) || Bettencourt (2–3) || None || 4,825 || 25–19 || 12–8
|- bgcolor="#ffdddd"
| April 28 || Tennessee ||  || McKethan Stadium || 2–4 || Godley (4–5) || Poyner (2–1) || None || 4,092 || 25–20 || 12–9
|-

|- bgcolor="#ffdddd"
| May 2 || at No. 3 LSU ||  || Alex Box StadiumBaton Rouge, LA || 2–3 || Bourgeois (3–1) || Harris (4–3) || Cotton (10) || 10,217 || 25–21 || 12–10
|- bgcolor="#ffdddd"
| May 3 || at No. 3 LSU ||  || Alex Box Stadium || 0–5 || Nola (9–0) || Poyner (2–2) || None || 10,947 || 25–22 || 12–11
|- bgcolor="#ffdddd"
| May 4 || at No. 3 LSU ||  || Alex Box Stadium || 6–18 || Eades (8–1) || Young (3–4) || None || 11,310 || 25–23 || 12–12
|- bgcolor="#ddffdd"
| May 6 ||  ||  || McKethan Stadium || 22–1 || Shafer (1–1) || Robert (2–2) || None || 2,654 || 26–23 || –
|- bgcolor="#ddffdd"
| May 7 || Florida Atlantic ||  || McKethan Stadium || 7–1 || Poyner (3–2) || Meiers (4–3) || None || 2,618 || 27–23 || –
|- bgcolor="#ffdddd"
| May 10 ||  ||  || McKethan Stadium || 4–7 || Kendrick (4–3) || Crawford (3–6) || Dedrick (7) || 3,658 || 27–24 || 12–13
|- bgcolor="#ddffdd"
| May 11 || Auburn ||  || McKethan Stadium || 5–4 || Vinson (1–0) || Carter (1–1) || None || 3,183 || 28–24 || 13–13
|- bgcolor="#ffdddd"
| May 12 || Auburn ||  || McKethan Stadium || 1–4 || Williamson (2–0) || Hanhold (0–3) || Dedrick (8) || 3,149 || 28–25 || 13–14
|- bgcolor="#ddffdd"
| May 16 || at  ||  || Foley FieldAthens, GA || 4–2 || Harris (5–3) || Boling (3–7) || Magliozzi (12) || 1,908 || 29–25 || 14–14
|- bgcolor="#ffdddd"
| May 17 || at Georgia ||  || Foley Field || 1–3 || McLaughlin (5–6) || Poyner (3–3) || Cole (4) || 3,016 || 29–26 || 14–15
|- bgcolor="#ffdddd"
| May 18 || at Georgia ||  || Foley Field || 2–9 || Ripple (3–1) || Hanhold (0–4) || None || 2,701 || 29–27 || 14–16
|-

|-
! style="background:#FF4A00;color:white;"| Postseason
|-

|- bgcolor="#ffdddd"
| May 21 || vs. (9)  || (8) || Metropolitan StadiumHoover, AL || 3–6 || Mengden (8–3) || Magliozzi (4–2) || None || 5,404 || 29–28 || 0–1  
|-

|- bgcolor="#ffdddd"
| May 31 || vs. (2)  || (3) || Bart Kaufman FieldBloomington, IN || 3–4 || Kemmer (6–0) || Harris  (5–4) || Rogers (22) || 1,092 || 29–29 || 0–1
|- bgcolor="#ffdddd"
| June 1 || vs. (4) Valparaiso || (3) || Bart Kaufman Field || 4–5 || Wormington (6–7) || Gibson  (2–1) || None || 1,112 || 29–30 || 0–2
|-

Rankings from USA Today/ESPN Top 25 coaches' baseball poll. All times Eastern. Parenthesis indicate tournament seedings. Retrieved from FloridaGators.com

Rankings

Awards and honors 
 Harrison Bader
 SEC Freshman of the Week (4/8/13–4/15/13). Bader batted .462 (6-for-13) with four RBI over four wins, including a win over No. 7 Florida State and a three-game sweep of No. 8 South Carolina. 
 Jonathon Crawford
 SEC Pitcher of the Week (3/25/13–4/1/13). Crawford pitched a complete game shutout, giving up only two hits in a 7–0 victory over No. 11 Ole Miss on March 30. 
 Zack Powers 
 Louisville Slugger National Player of the Week and Co-SEC Player of the Week (2/15/13–2/18/13). Powers batted 3-for-6 (.500) over three games against Duke and hit two grand slams on February 17.

Gators in the MLB Draft

References

External links
 Gator Baseball official website

Florida Gators baseball seasons
Florida Gators baseball team
Florida Gators
2013 NCAA Division I baseball tournament participants